Garlasco is a comune (municipality) in the Province of Pavia in the Italian region Lombardy, located about  southwest of Milan and about  west of Pavia.

The municipality of Garlasco contains the frazione (subdivision) Bozzola.

Garlasco borders the following municipalities: Alagna, Borgo San Siro, Dorno, Gropello Cairoli, Tromello, Zerbolò.

Demographic evolution

References

External links
 www.comune.garlasco.pv.it

Cities and towns in Lombardy